Next Academy Palm Beach, formerly known as Palm Beach Suns FC were an American soccer club based in Boca Raton, Florida. Founded in 2015, the team plays in USL League Two, the fourth tier of the American Soccer Pyramid.

The club was purchased by Brazilian company Next Academy and renamed to Next Academy Palm Beach in December 2017.

Year-by-year

References

USL League Two teams
Association football clubs established in 2015
2015 establishments in Florida
Soccer clubs in Florida
Soccer clubs in South Florida
Sports Clubs Palm Beach County
Sport Clubs Boca Raton
2018 disestablishments in Florida
Association football clubs disestablished in 2018